is a city located in Saga Prefecture on the island of Kyushu, Japan. The city was founded on May 1, 1954 through the merger of several towns and villages. As of March 1, 2017, the city has an estimated population of 19,202 and a population density of 200 persons per km². The total area is 96.93 km². Taku joined the UNESCO Global Network of Learning Cities in 2017.

Education

Elementary Schools
Hokubu Elementary School
Midori-ga-Oka Elementary School
Tobu Elementary School
Nosho Elementary School
Nanbu Elementary School
Nankei Elementary School
Chubu Elementary School
Seibu Elementary School

Junior High Schools
Tobu Junior High School
Seikei Junior High School
Chuou Junior High School

Senior High Schools
Taku Senior High School

Tourism and culture 
Taku Seibyō is a Confucian temple built in 1708 by Lord Shigefumi. This is one of the oldest Confucian temples in Japan and has been designated as an Important Cultural Asset. It is also the oldest original surviving Confucian temple. Each year many visitors are given free tours by volunteer student guides in Japanese.

The temple is host to festivals throughout the year. Usually students from the local schools participate in dances wearing colorful dress. In October 2008 the town of Taku celebrated the 300th anniversary of the temple by hosting a large festival that included traditional costumes, dances and a religious ceremony.

Famous people 
Machiko Hasegawa - One of the first female manga artists.

Location 
Taku City is located along Route 203, which is part of the Japanese National Highway system.

By car: Take Route 203 starting from either Karatsu or Kubota.

By train: Take the Karatsu Line either from Karatsu Station or Kubota Station. There are three stations you can get off at (coming from Kubota direction), Higashi-Taku Station, Naka-Taku Station or Taku Station.

Sister city relations
 - Qufu, Shandong,  China

References

External links

 Taku City official website 

Cities in Saga Prefecture
Populated places established in 1954